Yvonne Hagnauer (9 September 1898 – 1 November 1985) was a French hero, educator and Righteous among the Nations. Among the many people she saved was a young Marcel Marceau.

External links
 Yvonne Hagnauer – her activity to save Jews' lives during the Holocaust, at Yad Vashem website

1898 births
1985 deaths
Chevaliers of the Légion d'honneur
Female resistance members of World War II
Holocaust commemoration
Educators from Paris
French Righteous Among the Nations
French women in World War II
20th-century French women